Gerald Williams (born September 8, 1963) is a former American football defensive lineman in the National Football League (NFL) for the Pittsburgh Steelers, the Carolina Panthers, and the Green Bay Packers. He played college football at Auburn University, where he was named to the 1986 All-SEC team, and was drafted in the second round of the 1986 NFL Draft. He also spent several years as a college and pro scout for the Panthers. Williams spent the 2009 season as tight ends coach for the Division II Catawba Indians located in Salisbury, NC.

External links
NFL.com player page
bio

1963 births
Living people
People from Waycross, Georgia
Coaches of American football from Georgia (U.S. state)
Players of American football from Georgia (U.S. state)
American football defensive tackles
American football defensive ends
Auburn Tigers football players
Pittsburgh Steelers players
Carolina Panthers players
Green Bay Packers players
Catawba Indians football coaches